"Down with Love" is a popular song with lyrics by E.Y. Harburg and music by Harold Arlen. It was originally written in 1937 for Kay Thompson, but introduced by her replacement, Vivian Vance, who sang it with Jack Whiting and June Clyde in the Broadway musical Hooray for What!.
The song was recorded in 1940 by Eddie Condon's Orchestra with vocals by Lee Wiley. The song  has been performed by Judy Garland, Bobby Darin, and Blossom Dearie among others, and has become a pop and jazz standard. Barbra Streisand recorded "Down with Love" in 1963 for The Second Barbra Streisand Album, and performed the song live on The Judy Garland Show. Garland's rendition was featured in the 2003 movie Down with Love, with an additional version by Michael Bublé and Holly Palmer.

References

1937 songs
Judy Garland songs
Barbra Streisand songs
Pop standards
Songs from musicals
Songs with lyrics by Yip Harburg
Songs with music by Harold Arlen